is a detached object, discovered on 12 April 2010 on data taken at the Canada France Hawaii Telescope as part of the Next Generation Virgo Cluster Survey. It never gets closer than 48.5 AU from the Sun (about the outer edge of the Kuiper belt). Its large eccentricity strongly suggests that it was gravitationally scattered onto its current orbit. It has not been observed since 2015. It comes to opposition in late March each year in the constellation of Virgo.

Precovery images have been found back to 26 June 2009.

It reached perihelion (closest approach to the Sun) in mid-1951 and has moved beyond 70 AU in September 2014. It is possibly a dwarf planet.

Comparison

See also 
 List of Solar System objects most distant from the Sun

References

External links 
 
 

Minor planet object articles (unnumbered)
20100412